Agardhiella may refer to:
 Agardhiella (gastropod), a genus of gastropods in the family Argnidae
 Agardhiella (alga), a genus of algae in the family Solieriaceae